This is the episode list of the television series Penn & Teller Tell a Lie which airs on Discovery Channel.

Episode overview

Episode 1
Originally aired on October 5, 2011

Episode 2
Originally aired on October 12, 2011

Episode 3
Originally aired on October 19, 2011

Episode 4
Originally aired on October 26, 2011

Note - There was a second lie in this episode. This episode only had 6 stories, not 7 as the introduction stated.

Episode 5
Originally aired on November 2, 2011

Episode 6
Originally aired on November 9, 2011

References

Lists of American non-fiction television series episodes